Sweet Adelaide is a 1980 historical crime novel by the British writer Julian Symons. It is based on the real-life 1886 Pimlico Mystery concerning the possible murder Thomas Bartlett by his wife Adelaide. Symons had already enjoyed success with another Victorian-set mystery The Blackheath Poisonings.

References

Bibliography
 Bargainnier, Earl F. Twelve Englishmen of Mystery. Popular Press, 1984.
 Haste, Steve. Criminal Sentences: True Crime in Fiction and Drama. Cygnus Arts, 1997.
 Walsdorf, John J. & Allen, Bonnie J. Julian Symons: A Bibliography. Oak Knoll Press, 1996.

1980 British novels
Novels by Julian Symons
British crime novels
British mystery novels
British thriller novels
British historical novels
Collins Crime Club books
Novels set in London
Novels set in the 1880s